is a Nippon Professional Baseball player. He is currently with the Yomiuri Giants of Japan's Central League.

Notes and references

External links

Living people
1981 births
People from Gifu
Japanese baseball players
Nippon Professional Baseball pitchers
Hiroshima Toyo Carp players
Yomiuri Giants players
Japanese baseball coaches
Nippon Professional Baseball coaches